Tower of Ulission is an adventure for fantasy role-playing games published by Judges Guild in 1980.

Contents
Tower of Ulission is the Winter War IV tournament dungeon: a wilderness trek past several "dead cities," culminating in an adventure in the "dead village" of Ulission.  The second half of this adventure is Sword of Hope.

The Tower of Ulission allows the player characters a chance to travel a wilderness and small city inhabited by creatures of various types, from undead to minotaurs.

Publication history
Tower of Ulission was written by Dave Emigh, and was published by Judges Guild in 1980 as a 32-page book.

Reception
Elisabeth Barrington, reviewing The Tower of Ulission in The Space Gamer No. 28, notes that the adventure is well mapped out and presented, and contains exhaustive material for dungeon masters to use in their descriptions, but that the internal arrangement of the material could lead to some confusion. She concludes her review by saying, "Even so, DMs of all levels of skill should find Tower of Ulission relatively simple, whether to adapt to their own tastes or to play as it stands. The game flows well and requires little more from the DM than reading the booklet."

References

Judges Guild fantasy role-playing game adventures
Role-playing game supplements introduced in 1980